Andrea Pezzi (born November 21, 1973, Ravenna, Italy) is an Italian TV presenter and entrepreneur. He made his debut as a DJ for Radio Deejay and later became a video jockey for MTV Europe and MTV Italia from 1996 to 2003. Pezzi later moved to Rai and Mediaset to work as a television host.

From 2001 to 2006 Pezzi was a communication advisor for numerous international companies focused on the youth target (among them Nike, L'Oreal, Diesel, etc.). At the same time he was a columnist for the national financial newspaper Il Sole 24 ore.

In 2006 he founded OVO, a media company that produces short encyclopedic documentary videos for media platforms. In 2014 Pezzi founded Myntelligence, a platform for digital advertising automation.

References

External links 

1973 births
Living people
Italian businesspeople
People from Ravenna
Saint Petersburg State University alumni